Lyria anna is a species of sea snail, a marine gastropod mollusk in the family Volutidae, the volutes.

Distribution
Mauritius Island & Saint-Brandon Island, West Indian Ocean.

Description

References

External links

Volutidae
Gastropods described in 1835
Taxa named by René Lesson